Ding Wenjiang (Chinese: 丁文江; March 20, 1887 – January 5, 1936), courtesy name Zaijun, was a Chinese essayist, geologist, and writer active especially in the Republic of China (1912–49). In his own time, his name was transcribed as either V.K. Ting, or Ting Wen-chiang.

Biography

Early life
Ding was born into a wealthy family in Taixing, Jiangsu Province. He went to study in Japan in 1902, and later studied in Britain, majoring in zoology and geology. In 1911, Ding graduated from the University of Glasgow. After returning to China, he taught at Nanyang Public School (now Shanghai Jiao Tong University) in Shanghai. In 1913, Ding became the geological section chief in the Mining Administrative Bureau of the Ministry of Industry and Commerce, and went to Shanxi and Yunnan, conducting geological and mineral exploitation.

National Geological Survey
Together with Wong Wen-hao (Weng Wenhao in pinyin), Ding was also the founder of China's new National Geological Survey, where he collaborated closely with foreign scholars such as Johan Gunnar Andersson in training the first generation of Chinese geologists (Fiskesjö and Chen 2004; Fiskesjö 2011, Shen 2014). In 1921, Ding became the general manager of the Beipiao Mining Company, and founded the Chinese Geological Society. He served as vice president of the society, and was the editor-in-chief of "Chinese Palaeobiology".

In 1923, Ding published a paper, "Mythology and Science", arguing with Zhang Junmai over science and philosophy, fighting against the view that "science is irrelevant to human philosophy" (on the major debates of which this was a part, see Furth 1970).

Director
In 1925, Ding was appointed as the director of Shanghai Commercial Bureau. He represented Jiangsu provincial government to negotiate with foreign delegates to Shanghai. They signed "The Temporary Regulation on Reclamation of Juridical Rights in Shanghai by China" on August 1, 1926. In 1931, Ding became a professor of geology at Peking University. Together with Weng Wenhao and Zeng Shiying, he edited and published "New Geographic Map of the Republic of China", and "Provincial Maps of China". In June, 1934, Ding served as the chief staff of Academia Sinica. When he was exploring a coal mine in Hunan in 1936, he was poisoned by coal gas. Fu Sinian came from Beijing to take care of him. On January 5, Ding died in Xiangya Hospital in Changsha. Following his will, he was buried on Yuelu Mountain.

Author
Ding authored The Textbook of Zoology. His geological exploitation materials were compiled into Mr. Ding Wenjiang's Geological Investigation Report, and published in 1947. Ding was also the first Chinese scholar to systematically study the written words of Yi ethnicity (see Fiskesjö 2011). Hu Shih wrote Biography of Ding Wenjiang, and commented that he is "a most Europeanized Chinese, and a most scientifically styled Chinese." (Hu Shih: Ding Wenjiang). At the time of his death, he was working on a comprehensive book on the archaeology of ancient China.

References 

 Furth, Charlotte. Ting Wen-chiang: Science and China's New Culture. Cambridge: Harvard University Press, 1970. (This comprehensive biography focuses on Ding's scientific and political career, but almost entirely omits Ding's role in the creation of modern Chinese archaeology. A Chinese version was published in 1987: Ding Wenjiang—kexue yu zhongguo xin wenhua 丁文江—科学与中国新文化, translated by Ding’s niece, Ding Zilin, Jiang Yijian, and Yang Zhao. Changsha: Hunan Kexue jishu chubanshe, 1987) 
 Fiskesjö, Magnus and Chen Xingcan. China Before China: Johan Gunnar Andersson, Ding Wenjiang, and the Discovery of China’s Prehistory / 中国之前的中国:安特生,丁文江,和中国史前史的发现. Bilingual edition, in English and Chinese. A companion volume for the new exhibit at the Museum of Far Eastern Antiquities. Numerous archival illustrations. Stockholm: MFEA monographs no. 15, 2004. . (This monograph describes the dramatic beginnings of Neolithic archaeology in China in the 1920s, through the collaboration of Swedish scholar Johan Gunnar Andersson who worked at China's National Geological Survey from 1914 to 1925, with its founder-director, Ding Wenjiang. )
 Fiskesjö, Magnus. "Science across borders: Johan Gunnar Andersson and Ding Wenjiang." In: Stevan Harrell, Charles McKhann, Margaret Swain and Denise M. Glover, eds., Explorers and Scientists in China's Borderlands, 1880-1950. Seattle: University of Washington Press, 2011, pp. 240–66. . (In-depth discussion of Ding Wenjiang's life and career, as it intersected with the birth of modern archaeology in China.)  
 Shen, Grace Yen. Unearthing the Nation: Modern Geology and Nationalism in Republican China. Chicago: University of Chicago Press, 2014. (A general history of the development of modern geology in China)
 Hu Shih etc.″The Guy Ding Wenjiang.″/ Chinese:丁文江这个人 / Zhonghua Book Company, Beijing, 2014.8, 

Note: The above sources (esp. Furth 1970; Fiskesjö & Chen 2004) should be consulted for the correct titles of the Chinese-language works by Hu Shih and other writers, most of which are mistranslated and quoted incorrectly in English, in the entry text above—thus potentially misleading the readers of this entry.

1887 births
1936 deaths
20th-century essayists
20th-century Chinese geologists
Educators from Taizhou, Jiangsu
Academic staff of Peking University
Republic of China essayists
Republic of China science writers
Scientists from Taizhou, Jiangsu
Writers from Taizhou, Jiangsu